Fairfax is a historic mansion in White Pine, Jefferson County, Tennessee, USA.

History
The mansion was completed in 1840. It was built by Lawson D. Franklin (1801–1861), Tennessee's first millionaire, for his son, Isaac White Rodgers Franklin, Sr. (1827–1866). It was designed in the Greek Revival architectural style.

Senator Herbert S. Walters grew up in this house. By 1953, it was acquired by Thomas H. Berry and his wife, Ellen McClung. They restored it a year later, in 1954. They hired Irish painter James Reynolds to do the murals in the living-room.

Architectural significance
It has been listed on the National Register of Historic Places since April 13, 1973.  The house was surveyed and photographed for the Historic American Buildings Survey, where it is called the Isaac Franklin House.

References

Houses in Jefferson County, Tennessee
Houses completed in 1840
Greek Revival houses in Tennessee
Houses on the National Register of Historic Places in Tennessee
National Register of Historic Places in Jefferson County, Tennessee